Kseniya Aleksandrovna Aksyonova (née Ustalova) (born 14 January 1988 in Sverdlovsk) is a Russian track and field sprinter who specialises in the 400 metres.

She has won gold medals in the 4 × 400 metres relay with Russia in European competition in the junior (2007), under-23 (2009) and senior (2010) levels. She won the silver medal in the individual 400 m at the 2010 European Athletics Championships with a personal best run of 49.92 seconds. She won the relay gold at the 2011 Summer Universiade and won her first global level medal with a relay bronze at the 2012 IAAF World Indoor Championships.

Ustalova began 2013 with an indoor best 51.31 seconds to win the Russian indoor title.

International competitions

References

1988 births
Living people
Sportspeople from Yekaterinburg
Russian female sprinters
Universiade gold medalists in athletics (track and field)
Universiade gold medalists for Russia
Medalists at the 2011 Summer Universiade
Medalists at the 2013 Summer Universiade
World Athletics Championships athletes for Russia
Authorised Neutral Athletes at the World Athletics Championships
World Athletics Indoor Championships medalists
European Athletics Championships winners
European Athletics Championships medalists
Russian Athletics Championships winners